Gry Nergård (born 1 April 1966) is a Norwegian civil servant.

She hails from Levanger and took the cand.jur. degree at the University of Oslo. After a stint as a clerk in the Ministry of the Environment she was hired in the Office of the Consumer Ombudsman in 1992. In 2010 she was appointed as the Norwegian Consumer Ombudsman. Leaving in 2016, she was hired in Finance Norway.

She resides at Slependen, and has been active in the local sports club IL Jardar.

References

1966 births
Living people
People from Levanger
University of Oslo alumni
Norwegian jurists
Directors of government agencies of Norway
Ombudsmen in Norway